John J. Casbarian is an American architect, currently the Harry K. & Albert K. Smith Professor at Rice University. He is a Fellow at American Academy in Rome.

References

Year of birth missing (living people)
Living people
Rice University faculty
American architects
Rice University alumni
California Institute of the Arts alumni
Place of birth missing (living people)